Chilara taylori, the spotted cusk-eel, is a species of cusk-eel found along the eastern coast of the Pacific Ocean where it is found at depths down to around  from Washington, United States to Ecuador. This species grows to a length of  TL.  It is the only known member of its genus.

References

Ophidiidae
Fish of the Pacific Ocean
Fish described in 1858
Taxa named by Charles Frédéric Girard